The secretary of national defense is the head of the Department of National Defense and is a member of the president's Cabinet.

The current acting secretary is Carlito Galvez  Jr., who assumed office on January 9, 2023.

This cabinet post is considered one of the stepping stones of the Philippine presidency. Two secretaries of defense were elected president: Ramon Magsaysay in 1953 and Fidel V. Ramos in 1992. Several others have run for president, such as Alejo Santos, Juan Ponce Enrile, Renato de Villa, Norberto Gonzales and Gilbert Teodoro.

List of secretaries of national defense
Prior to the department's formation in 1935, President Emilio Aguinaldo established a similar department, the Department of War and Public Works. Three individuals served as heads of the department. They are as follows:

Revolutionary Government and First Philippine Republic

Commonwealth and Republics of the Philippines

External links
DND website

References

 
Defense